Joanne Greenberg (born September 24, 1932, in Brooklyn, New York) is an American author who published some of her work under the pen name of Hannah Green. She was a professor of anthropology at the Colorado School of Mines and a volunteer Emergency Medical Technician.

Greenberg is best known for the semi-autobiographical bestselling novel I Never Promised You a Rose Garden (1964). It was adapted into a 1977 movie and a 2004 play of the same name.

She received the Harry and Ethel Daroff Memorial Fiction Award as well as the National Jewish Book Award for Fiction in 1963 for her debut novel The King's Persons (1963), about the massacre of the Jewish population of York at York Castle in 1190.

Greenberg appears in the Daniel Mackler documentary Take These Broken Wings (2004) about recovering from schizophrenia without the use of psychiatric medication.

Her book In This Sign (1970) was made into a Hallmark Hall of Fame television movie titled Love Is Never Silent, aired on NBC in December 1985.

Bibliography
The King's Persons (1963)
I Never Promised You a Rose Garden (1964)
The Monday Voices (1965)
Summering: A Book of Short Stories (1966)
In This Sign (1970)
And Sarah Laughed (1972)
Rites of Passage (short stories) (1972)
Founder's Praise (1976)
High Crimes and Misdemeanors (short stories) (1979)
A Season of Delight (1981)
The Far Side of Victory (1983)
Simple Gifts (1986)
Age of Consent (1987)
Of Such Small Differences (1988)
With The Snow Queen (short stories) (1991)
No Reck'ning Made (1993)
Where The Road Goes (1998)
Appearances (2006)
Miri, Who Charms (2009)
All I've Done for You (2017)
Jubilee Year  (2019)

References

External links
Official Website
Profile at National Association for Rights Protection and Advocacy

https://web.archive.org/web/20070220130719/http://www.mines.edu/fac_staff/senate/dist_lecture/greenberg_bio.shtml
http://www.fantasticfiction.co.uk/g/joanne-greenberg/
http://www.jdcc.org/index.php/site/news/629/
I Never Promised You a Rose Garden reading group guide

1932 births
Living people
Writers from Brooklyn
20th-century American novelists
21st-century American novelists
American women short story writers
American women novelists
Colorado School of Mines faculty
People with schizophrenia
20th-century American women writers
21st-century American women writers
20th-century American short story writers
21st-century American short story writers
Novelists from New York (state)
Novelists from Colorado
Pseudonymous women writers
American women academics
20th-century pseudonymous writers
21st-century pseudonymous writers